Kullanari Koottam is a 2011 Indian Tamil-language romantic comedy film written and directed by Sribalaji and produced by V. Ashish Jain. It stars Vishnu Vishal and Remya Nambeesan in the lead roles, while the crew of Vennila Kabadi Kuzhu reunited for this film, with V. Selvaganesh composing the film's score and J. Laxman and Kasi Viswanathan handling cinematography and editing, respectively. The film was released on 25 March 2011 to mixed to positive reviews and become a decent hit at the box-office.

Plot
Vetrivel Shanmugasundaram (Vishnu Vishal), an MBA graduate who does not find a job, lives with his family in the temple city of Madurai. One day, his father gives him Rs. 1500 to e-recharge his mobile phone. However, under confusion, he says the number to the recharge girl fast, and she recharges to another number which belongs to Priya (Remya Nambeesan). After some time, Vetri realizes and asks Priya to return the money. While they meet, they fall in love and decide to get married. She asks him to see her father Sethuraman (Paramasivan), who is a Police Sub-Inspector in Ranuvapetai. He asks him to join the army or at least become a police officer, only then he will allow him to marry his daughter. The rest of the story revolves how Vetri succeeds in his love and job despite bad selection officers at selection. In the meantime, Vetri also makes friends with other participants at the selection.

Cast
 Vishnu Vishal as Vetrivel Shanmugasundaram "Vetri"
 Remya Nambeesan as Priya Sethuraman
 Paramasivam as Sethuraman
 Soori as Murugesan
 Appukutty as Lenin
 Ravi Venkatraman as Sankara Narayanan
 Hari Vairavan as Naseer
 Pandi as Narayanan
 A. Ramesh Pandian
 Mayi Sundar
 Aiyyappan

Soundtrack
The music of the film was composed by V. Selvaganesh. The soundtrack album was released by A. R. Rahman in Chennai. The soundtrack opened to generally positive reviews, and the song "Vizhigalile" became popular.

Reception
Kullanari Koottam received mixed reviews. The Times of India gave 3 stars out of 5 and wrote, "Sribalaji makes a middling debut as director with this movie. Though it could have been made into a breezy entertainer, it ends up as an unsatisfactory watch". Rediff gave 2.5 stars out of 5 and wrote, "Sri Balaji's script does lack logic in a few places and sags at times, but taken with its humour quotient, it's still a reasonably fresh attempt at a feel-good love story". The Hindu wrote, "It's heartening that writer and director Sri Balaji has consciously steered clear of clichés in his maiden attempt. Without a hero who challenges the cantankerous, villains who are ruthless, a comedy track that's disjointed, stunts which are unbelievable and duets that come with unnatural jigs, Sri Balaji has made Kullanari Kootam fairly engaging". Sify wrote, "Like the proverbial curate's egg, KK is good in parts, but could have been better". The New Indian Express wrote, "The film is mildly engaging, and a clean wholesome entertainer".

Behindwoods gave 1 star out of 5 and wrote, "The plot had the potential to be woven into an interesting tale, had only the director made an attempt to impart some airtight packaging in the content. KNK very slowly unravels, takes various detours in its path, the scenes and dialogues get boring and the concept flounders. The connection of the audience with the characters does not happen and the amateurish performance of most of the artists further adds up to this factor". Indiaglitz wrote, "Kudos to Sri Balaji and Vishnu for rendering a movie that is entertaining and light without any overdose of emotions. If you are not looking for a serious stuff, "Kullanari Koottam" may be the right choice to spend few hours of your weekend". Deccan Herald wrote, "Rendered in a lackadiscal fashion, Sribalaji's Kullanari Koottam is not the proverbial entertainer and falls flat in its intentions with nothing to write home about".

References

External links
 
Kullanari Koottam Movie Review

2011 films
Films shot in Madurai
2010s Tamil-language films
Films scored by V. Selvaganesh
Indian comedy films
2011 directorial debut films
2011 comedy films